This is a list of television programmes broadcast by TV9 either currently broadcast or formerly broadcast on TV9 in Malaysia. Some dramas which had been broadcast on this channel are not listed in this article.

The literal translation of the name of certain programmes is provided in brackets.

Asian Programme 
Barrack O'Karma 1968
Forensic Heroes V

Current programmes 
The programmes listed below are not children-related. Some local programmes may also have repeats on certain times of the day.

0-9 
#kedaigunting - started airing in March 2014
 15 Minutes of Fame
 7 Suami
 9 Soalan - talk show

A 
 A Woman Scorned
 Alif Imani
 Anak Ke-5 - comedy series under the #kelakarama block, started airing in mid-January 2015
 Apa Saja... FBI - talk show hosted by radio personality Faizal Ismail; airing since 2011; since December 2013 with the presenter going outdoors instead of being in the studio in front of audience
 Aroma Kota Suci - airing during Ramadan 1435H/2014M

B 
 Bedah vs Joyah
 Berita TV9 - news programme
 Bikin Panas - part of the 9X programme block, started airing on 11 October 2014
 Bila Bujang Masuk Dapur - was aired during Ramadan 1435H/2014M
 Binar Bening Berlian
 Bintang Mencari Bintang Spontan - spin-off of Bintang Mencari Bintang; airing since May 2014
 Bismillah - airing on this channel since 20 January 2014 with episodes from 2013; also firstly aired on TV3
 Book Club - Islamic book reviewing programme, started airing in April 2015
 The Bucket List - under the 9X programme block, airing since May 2014
 Buletin 1:30
 Buletin FM - (Broadcast as Buletin FM since 3 August 2021 after rebranding exercise announced on the previous day) (Formerly broadcast as Kool FM since 4 May 2021) (Daily 3:30am to 4:30am)

C 
 Celik Hati Prof Muhaya - aired between April and June 2013, returned in April 2014
 Cinta 7 Susun
 Cinta Pandang Kedua

D 
 Destiny Ties
 Diva - comedy talk show under the #kelakarama block, started airing in mid-January 2015
 Don't Mess With An Angel - airing between March and December 2014; original title when first aired was Cuidado Con El Angel, this later changed to English translation of title
 Dunia Generasi Baru - a new version of the former popular university TV series Dunia Baru at TV3 in 2006; tells the story of six friends living in a campus from various backgrounds and with hilarious reasons; the series took place an IUMW; airing since mid-April 2015

E
 Emergency Couple

F 
 Fail Riz - started airing during Ramadan 1435H/2014M
 Festival: Jurnal Kembara Dunia - started airing on 16 August 2014
 Flower of Evil (20 August 2021) (Broadcast on Wednesday, Thursday 10:00pm to 11:00pm and Friday 10:30pm to 11:30pm) (also aired on TV3) (Chamsarang programme block)
 Football Asia Show - airing since 16 February 2014
 The Football Review - airing since April 2014; also airs on TV3
 Familiar Wife - also airs on TV3

G 
 Galaksi (lit: Galaxy) – entertainment news programme
 Go Travel (also aired on TV3 and Awesome TV) and (formerly in TV2)

H 
 Hadis - started airing in April 2015
 Halaqah – Islamic affairs discussion programme
 Hijab Stailista - Islamic women's fashion programme, started in January 2013
 Hip TV - entertainment news programme
 Hot TV - entertainment programme presented by Hot FM deejays, airs as a weekly programme instead as of August 2013 which was previously known as Hot TV Ekstra which was a compilation of best segments aired in Hot TV which was aired on Monday-Wednesday; both air under the 9X programme block; was on hiatus in April 2014
 Hotel Del Luna (7 October 2020) (Wednesday to Friday  from 10:00pm to 11:00pm) (also aired on TV3) (Chamsarang programme block)

J 
 Jawab Adik - started airing in January 2015
 Jejak Rasul - started airing in June 2019

K 
 Kifarah (25 March 2021) (Wednesday to Friday 10:00pm to 11:00pm)

L
 Lari Misi Mr. X - started airing in April 2015
 Legends of Dawn: The Sacred Stone - started airing in September 2021
 LFC TV - started airing in January 2015

M 
  Mad Markets - shopping and travelling programme hosted by local blogger Hanis Zalikha; part of the 9X programme block; Season 1 aired in late 2012; Season 2 aired in September 2013 where she was accompanied by another host; Season 4 aired since January 2015
 Majalah 3 - started airing on 6 May 2019
 Marriage, Not Dating
 Melodi – entertainment news programme
 Melting Me Softly (11 December 2020) (Wednesday to Friday 10:00pm to 11:00pm) (also aired on TV3) (Chamsarang programme block)
 Menongkah Kasih
 Menu Kalimah - airing in Ramadan 1433H/2012M and later continued in late 2012; re-airing during Ramadan 1435H/2014M
 The Moon Embracing The Sun - Korean drama under the Chamsarang programme block, previously aired on 8TV
 Molek FM - (coming soon)
 Mother - (also aired on TV3) (18 January 2021) (Wednesday to Friday from 10:00pm to 11:00pm) (also aired on TV3) (Chamsarang programme block)
 MotoGP
 Mingguan Esports MyGameOn - shows about the latest e-sports news; aired during 5 June – 25 August 2020

O 
 ONE Championship - airing since 8 February 2014 (now running on RTM TV1)

P 
 Pop Corn TV
 Pop Krew - dance and singing reality show, aired in November and December 2014
 Pop TV – entertainment news programme
 Produce 101

R 
 Ride - local drama series
 Running Man

S 
 Safiyya - magazine programme concentrating on Muslim women's lifestyle
 Salam Ustaz - first aired during Ramadan 1435H/2014M; returned with new episodes since January 2015; airing on TV3 since May 2015
 Semanis Kurma - Islamic husband and wife-related discussion programme; was on hiatus between April and June 2013
 Senario - reruns of 1998 and 1999 episodes in one hour, airing on this channel since January 2015
 SIS Semangat Intelek Swadaya - Islamic teenage women's magazine programme, started in January 2013 and still airing
 Soal Drama - discusses current issues of current and popular dramas on the Media Prima television network. Started aired in February 2021 (formerly aired on ntv7 in January)
 Stella - local drama fantasy series

T 
 Tale of the Nine Tailed (15 January 2022) (Friday to Monday 11:00pm to 12:00am)
 Tanweer - Islamic discussion programme aimed towards youths; started airing on 24 October 2014, last episode before hiatus was on 7 November 2014
 Tanyalah Ustaz (lit: Ask the Ustaz) - a show where an ustaz will talk on a topic and answers questions relating to the topic with its viewers via telephone and Tanyalah Ustazs Facebook page, it has moved to TV3 since 31 December 2018 and later return to broadcast at 1:30pm as TV3 programmes rerun at 6 May 2019 until moved back to TV9 programmes with extend time till 8:30am at 30 September 2019.
 Tanyalah Ustazah
 Tari Tirana - airing as a rerun on this channel as of February 2014, formerly aired on TV3
 The Good Detective (24 June 2021) (Wednesday to Friday 10:00pm to 11:00pm) (Timeslot change on 6 August 2021 onwards, Friday 10:30pm to 11:30pm) (also aired on TV3) (Chamsarang programme block)
 TNA Xplosion - started airing on 12 May 2014
 Tour de Mayhem
 Two Days And One Night - aired briefly in late 2013 and early 2014, returning in August 2014

W 
 World's Most Amazing Videos - formerly aired on TV3

Children's block (Bananana) 
This is a separate list of children's programmes that are aired under the Bananana brand by Media Prima where it is also used by TV3, NTV7 8TV and Tonton (video portal); they are either produced or dubbed to the Malay language or retained in their original language.

Nickelodeon block (Nick di 9)

 All Grown Up (2006-2008)
 Avatar: The Legend of Aang (2007-2013)
 Back at the Barnyard (2009-2013)
 Blue's Clues (2006-2008)
 CatDog (2007-2008; 2011-2012)
 Catscratch (2007-2008)
 ChalkZone (2006-2008)
 Danny Phantom (2006-2011)
 Dora the Explorer (2006-2012)
 Edgar & Ellen (2009-2011)
 El Tigre: The Adventures of Manny Rivera (2008-2011)
 Fanboy & Chum Chum (2010-2013)
 Go, Diego, Go! (2007-2012)
 Hey Arnold! (2007-2008; 2011-2012)
 iCarly (2010-2011)
 Kappa Mikey (2008-2012)
 My Life as a Teenage Robot (2006-2010)
  Oswald (2006-2013)
 Planet Sheen (2011-2013)
 Robot and Monster (2014)
 Rocko's Modern Life (2007-2008; 2011-2012)
 Rugrats (2007-2008; 2011-2012)
 SpongeBob SquarePants (2006-2014)
 Tak and the Power of Juju (2009-2010)
 Teenage Mutant Ninja Turtles (2013-2014)
 The Adventures of Jimmy Neutron (2006-2014)
 The Fairly Odd Parents (2008-2014)
 The Legend of Korra (2013-2014)
 The Mighty B! (2009-2013)
 The Penguins of Madagascar (2010-2014)
 The Wonder Pets! (2007-2012)
 The X's (2008)
 T.U.F.F. Puppy (2012-2014)

 Bananana block 
 The Amazing Awang Kenit - local animation series; started airing on 11 October 2014
 Bananana Squad - short children's programme, also airs on TV3 and NTV7; airing throughout 2013, returned in late March 2014
 Bananana Squad HQ - local weekly children's programme airing since 24 March 2014, also airs first on TV3
 Bola Kampung - local animated series concentrating on football, also airs on TV1 during school holidays in March and May–June 2013 and in regular run as of February 2014; formerly aired on TV2 and TV3 in the late 2000s; formerly aired on Disney XD Southeast Asia until it was replaced by Chuck Chicken, Harry & Bunnie and The Oddbods Show
 Canimals - also airs on TV1 as of September 2012 and on TV2 as of October 2013
 Destinasi G4 - local live-action series started airing in January 2016
 Ema Emyliana - local live-action series, airing on this channel as of March 2014, previously aired firstly on TV3 in late 2013, Season 2 started airing on TV3 since 13 August 2014
 Upin & Ipin - also airs on Astro Ceria, Disney Channel (Asia) and Disney XD
 Wizards of Waverly Place - started airing on this channel briefly in late December 2014, returned since April 2014 in double episodes and Malay dubbed; also airs on TV3 in rerun as of 2014

 Former programmes  #gerilaproject - programme about Go Gerila's works after winning Versus in 20132013 Africa Cup of Nations - licensed from Eurosport2014 AFF Suzuki Cup - live coverage for five Malaysia team (one group stage match, both semi-finals, and both finals) and delayed for both semi-finals between Thailand vs Philippines, licensed from Fox Sports.
 2014 Asian Games (with TV3)
 3 Hari 2 Malam (lit: 3 Days 2 Nights) - travelogue programme
 5 Jingga - local drama in Malay, formerly aired on 8TV
 6 Progresif - youth drama series; two seasons have been aired between 2011 and 2013
 7th Grade Civil Servant - Korean drama under the Chamsarang programme block
 Aaahh!!! Real Monsters - formerly aired on TV1 in early 2000s using original version
 Adik & Al-Quran Adik Beradik Unik (lit: Unique siblings) - briefly aired, also formerly aired on TV3 in the 1990s
 Adik Tanya Ustaz - rerun on TV3 as of May 2015 
 The Adventures of Jimmy Neutron - also formerly aired on TV3 in original version
AFC (until 2016) - licensed from Fox Sports
2015 AFC Asian Cup (live coverage for final match only, delayed for others)
AFC Cup (live coverage for involving clubs from Malaysia and delayed from outside Malaysia)Aishiteru - local drama
 Aizat Gegar NZ - travelogue programme under the 9X programme block
 Akademi Al-Quran - Al-Quran reciting competition; aired for 5 seasons in 2006 and 2007, later from 2009 to 2011
 Akademi Nasyid - Nasyid singing competition, aired in 2007
 Akademi Polis (lit: Police Academy) - drama series
 Al-Quran Menjawab Bersama Dr Zainal - Islamic programme airing during Ramadan; hosted by Dr Dainal Zainal Abidin in 2012, changed to Ustaz Haslin Ibrahim in 2013
 Al-Risaalah Alahai Fafau - talk show hosted by radio personality Fara Fauzana
 Alam Maya - local drama series
 All Grown Up! Ampang Medikal - medical drama series, formerly aired on NTV7
 Anak-Anak Sidek (lit: The Sidek's Sons) - animated programme telling about the Sidek brothers; first aired on TV1 in the early 2000s, airing on RTM TVi as of July 2011
 Anak Siapa Ni Eh? (lit: Whose Child is this, Eh?) - Season 1 re-ran in January and February 2012; produced by Malaysian Children's Television Foundation; two seasons were aired between 2006 and 2007 with English subtitles during its original run; also aired on TV Pendidikan in 2008 without English subtitles
 Animal Crackers - original Malay-dubbed version aired in 2006; also aired on Astro Ceria in 2007 using another dubbed version
 Anugerah - Indonesian television series
 Apa Ke Halnya? - aired in 2009; re-run on Emas Hypp TV since November 2013
 Arang and the Magistrate - Korean drama under the Chamsarang programme block
 Australia Smashes Guinness World Records Awal Lagi - entertainment talk show hosted by radio personality Awal Ashaari, first aired in 2012 and recorded at Starbucks KLCC, returning in 2013 as a live programme from NTV7 Glenmarie
 Ayahku Kahwin Lagi (lit: My Father gets Married Again)
 Baby Looney Tunes - aired in 2013, formerly aired on TV3
 Bait Cinta Bakugan Battle Brawlers  - briefly aired during the year-end school holidays in 2009; first and now airs on TV3 using the dubbed American version since 2009 Beginning With Bakugan Battle Planet With TV3 From 28 August 2020.
 Barney & Friends - formerly aired on NTV7, originally aired on TV1, aired on TV3 as of June 2010
 Batman: The Animated Series - not yet airing
 Batman of the Future - aired in late 2012, Malay dubbed; also airs on NTV7
 Battle Doll Angelic Layer - formerly aired on TV3 in 2006
 Bello the Amazing Kid - also aired on TV3 with original version
 Beautiful Places - local travelogue programme
 Berita Adik - short children's news programme aired before the start and at the end of Nick di 9 programme block at 2:28pm and 5:28pm, aired in 2011 and 2012
 Beyblade - formerly aired on TV3 in 2002
 The Big Bang - was aired in 2009, only 1996–1998 episodes aired; the early 2000s episodes were aired on Astro TVIQ in 2009
 Bintang Mencari Pasal - comedy sketch programme with performances by  contestants who are currently in Bintang Mencari Bintang, a reality talent programme on TV3; airs as a companion show
 Biru Cinta De Laguna Blogger Boy - local drama in Malay, formerly aired on 8TV
 Blue's Clues - also formerly aired on TV3 in original version
 Bola Kampung Extreme - spin-off series from Bola Kampung
 Bong – has aired for 4 seasons, also repeated on TV3
 Bugged - French animated series; in French it is known as Gnark Bulan, Bintang & Kita - local drama series under the 9X programme block
 Bunga Merah Punya Cabaran Calci Yum - game show, aired in early 2000s
 Cari Menantu (lit: Finding an In-law) - aired in 2007 and 2008
 The Cave of the Golden Rose - aired in late 2011
 Ceplos - ghost-related comedy series
 ChalkZone - formerly aired on TV1 using original version in 2011, was also formerly aired on TV3 in 2007 using original version
 Charlie Chaplin Chopp!! – short programme focusing on happening events news and TV9's programmes airing at prime time
 CID 3278 Cingkus Blues - local animated series
 Cinta Antara Benua - local drama series aired on TV3 in late 1990s
 Cinta Fitri -  Season 1
 Cinta Jangan Pergi - local drama aired in early 2013; airing on TV3 as of February 2014
 Cinta Medik (lit: Medic Love) - was also aired on TV3 in 2007
 Cipta Rasa Ramadan Dutch Lady - cooking programme aired in Ramadan 1434H/2013, repeats aired on this channel, firstly aired on TV3
 Cita & Cinta Citra Juwita - drama series
 Crocodile Hunter - also aired on TV3 in the early 2000s
 The Daffy Duck Show Dalam Setiap Sujud - local drama
 Danger Mouse - early 1990s episodes only; first aired on TV3 in 2002
 Danny Phantom - also formerly aired on TV3 in 2009 with Malay subtitles
 Dragon Ball – only some first early episodes aired in 2006; first aired on TV2 in the 1990s, later aired on Astro Ceria in 2011 using a new dubbed version
 Dream Sisters - local drama reality series under the 9X programme block
 Duckula - first aired on TV3 in 2002
 Dunia Eicak - local animated series; airing on this channel since September 2013, also airing on TV3 since 2012
 E-toyol.com - re-run on TV3 as of May 2013
 Eckhart Ekspedisi Chef Wan (lit: Chef Wan's Expedition)
 El Tigre - also formerly aired on TV3 in 2009 with Malay subtitles
 Elmo's World - airing as “Elmo dan Kawan Kawan” Emergency - local real-life emergency procedure programme
 Extreme Ghostbusters - aired without Malay dubbing
 The Fairly OddParents - was aired on this channel, also formerly aired on TV2 in 2005 using original version; has aired on TV3 since 30 August 2014 with Season 6
 Felix the Cat - also aired on Astro Ceria with Malay dubbing
 Filem di 9  (lit: Films on 9) - reviews newly released and upcoming movies; aired between 2007 and 2008
 Finley the Fire Engine  – previously aired in February 2012, was also aired in December 2010 and November 2011, formerly aired on TV1 in 2007
 Flash and Dash – Chinese animation series, has aired Series 2; Series 1 was previously a repeat of previous episode on this channel while it is aired on TV3 as a sponsored programme in 2009
 Fly FM Stripped - unplugged local performances music programme from Fly FM, airs under the 9X programme block
 Friday I'm In Love - local drama aired in 2012Fanboy & Chum Chum - Airing since 2012 with original version, even aired on TV3 with Malay subtitles.
 Fullmetal Alchemist - also aired on TV3 and NTV7
 Fuzz Food - travelogue programme on food under the 9X programme block
 Gadis Melayu - reality series aired between 2008 and 2010
 Geletek (lit: Tickle) - local comedy sketches series; re-ran on Emas on Hypp TV as of September 2013
 Geng Bahasa Arab - Arabic language teaching programme for children aired in 2010; during its first few episodes, some newspaper TV guides had the programme title as Kelas Bahasa Arab Go, Diego, Go - aired on TV2 in 2010 and TV3 in 2011
 Gol & Gincu - formerly aired on 8TV
 Got to Believe - aired between 29 December 2014 and early April 2015
 Guinness World Records - formerly aired on NTV7 in the early 2000s
 Halaqah Sentuhan Qalbu - separate named Islamic-related programme, more concentrating on discussing audiences and guests in the studio about Islam; aired in 2011
 Hamtaro  - Malay-dubbed from original version; formerly aired in American version on NTV7 in with Malay subtitles in the early 2000s, later changed to Malay dubbing
 Hartamania - children's game show in pirate's style; aired in 2009
 He-Man and the Masters of the Universe - formerly aired on TV3 in the 1980s
 Heroman - first aired in early 2010s; returning on 30 August 2014
 Hilltop Hospital - as listed but not aired as of December 2011
 Handy Manny - it was aired until 2011 it started airing on TV2
 Hujah –  current affairs discussion programme
 I-Glam - fashion show
 I Miss You - Korean drama under the Chamsarang programme block
 Idola Kecil  - children's singing competition airing in November and December, 5 seasons have been aired since 2008; also has related series including Idola Kecil The Series, Hari Raya Aidilfitri 2010 special Idola Kecil Idola Besar, Hari Raya Aidilfitri 2013 special Bananana Squad vs Idola Kecil 5, and telemovie Idola Kecil Pengembaraan Ben Idola Kecil Ultra - aired in mid-2014
 Ilmu Alam Ghaib - airing on this channel as a re-run since mid-2010; firstly aired on TV3 in 2010
 Impian Raya Emelyn - rerun since late June 2014, first aired in 2011
 Ini Kisahku - real-life stories about people practising Islam
 Inspector Gadget - Malay dubbed version; formerly aired on NTV7 in original version in the early 2000s, TV1 in the early 1990s and on TV2 in early 2014 with Malay subtitles
 Inuyasha - formerly aired on NTV7 in 2006
 IQRA - basic Al-Quran teaching programme for children; first aired on TV3 in the mid-1990s and later in 2009 on the same channel
 It Only Hurts When I Laugh - American funny clips compilation programme, airing since December 2011, also airing on NTV7 since late April 2014
 Jaguh Badminton (lit: Badminton Warrior) - badminton reality series for children 
 Jalan Jalan Bazar Ramadan - airing during Ramadan 1435H/2014M
 Jeff Corwin Experience Jersi 9 - Malay drama series about football aired in 2010
 Jet Lag - travelogue programme under the 9X programme block, aired in early 2013
 Jom Main! - sponsored by Johnson's Baby, programme related to babies playing outside with their parents
 Jom Berbuka Justice League - not yet airing, formerly aired on TV3
 Kaki Bola - football talk show programme aired in 2012, returning on TV3 in November 2012
 Kali Kedua Kampung Girl - airing on this channel since September 2014; previously aired on TV3
 Kan-Cheong Kitchen - formerly aired on 8TV
 Kappa Mikey Kawanku Bintang Coca-Cola - aired in late 2010
 Ke Korea Ke Kita? - visiting South Korea travelogue programme under the 9X programme block, starting January 2014
 Kelab Upin & Ipin - aired in mid-2011
 Kelas Fardhu Ain Keluang Man - formerly aired on TV1 in the late 1990s, It was reaired again in 2017.
 Keluarga di 9 (lit: Family on 9)  - family discussion programme aired in 2007, aired as reruns in June 2010
 Kerana Lelaki Itu Kerana Suka - local magazine programme on indiepreneur under the 9X programme block
 Khurafat - documentary series on certain local customs that are forbidden in Islam
 Kiamat Sudah Dekat - Indonesian religious sinetron which was based from the movie of the same name; it was then the first sinetron aired in 2006 and was aired for two seasons
 Kid vs. Kat - aired briefly in mid-2010
 Kidz In Motion - foreign kids programme on sports and extreme sports in English; aired in late 2013
 The King 2 Hearts - previously aired on 8TV
 Knight Rider Kochikame - on hiatus as of April 2013; returned in April 2012 after a long hiatus; first aired on TV3 in 2009, later moved to this channel in 2010
 Kokolog - cooking show, aired in March 2014
 Kraf Kraf Kreatif - children's art making programme, aired in mid-2011
 La Vendetta Lagenda - programme block dedicated to dramas adapted from local folklores, aired from Monday to Thursday at 8:30 pm and was aired between 2008 and 2010, also airing on TV3 at 4:30 pm, ended in late 2011 on TV3 and replaced with Azalea slot airing at 4:00 pm in 2012
 Lagu Cinta Nirmala Latido - music video programme, frequently was the last programme on TV9 until late 2008
 Let's & Go -  formerly aired on TV3 in 2001-2002 
 Little Women II: Jo's Boys Little Einsteins Little Red Tractor The Looney Tunes Show Luluhnya Sebuah Ikrar - local drama series
 Mahir Jawi - Jawi writing learning programme for children, aired in 2011
 Makan Angin - travelogue programme; season 1 aired in late 2010, season 2 in mid-2011, season 3 in mid-2013 and season 4 in late 2013; Season 1 reran on Emas on Hypp TV ch 112 as of early 2014, Season 2 reruns on Emas on Hypp TV ch 112 as of March 2014 and Season 4 reran on TV3 in February 2014 and on NTV7 in mid-October 2014
 Makmal Masak - local children's programme aired in July 2014, rerun in December 2014
 Malam Ini... - programme with performances from guest artists and comedy sketches, aired in late 2000s, reruns on Emas on Hypp TV as of February 2014
 Malin Kundang - Indonesian sinetron; first aired on TV3 for the first few episodes in 2007
 Mangkuk Tingkat - cooking programme
 Marchen Awaken Romance - now re-runs on TV3
 Marhabba De Laila 
 Mari Bertarannum - an Al-Quran learning programme for children airing in 2008, shown as early morning re-runs on TV3 in 2010
 Mari Mengaji - an Al-Quran learning programme for children aired in 2006, shown as early morning re-runs on TV3 in 2010
 Masked Rider 555 - aired in late 2010
 Masked Rider Blade - also aired American dubbed episodes as of July 2012
 Masked Rider Ryuki - aired in early 2011, re-ran in January 2012
 Medabots - Malay dubbed version in 2009; formerly aired on NTV7 in 2002 with Malay subtitles
 Megas XLR - aired in 2008 in original version, later re-ran with Malay dubbing
 Mencari Resipi Turun Temurun - cooking show which goes to Europe, airing in Ramadan 1434H/2013M
 Menjana Impian (lit: Achieving Dreams) - was sponsored by Maggi, aired in 2008
 Menu Malaysia - local cuisine cooking show formerly aired on TV3 in the mid-1990s
 Mickey Mouse and Friends - aired in 2014, was aired on TV3
 The Mighty B! Mila & Biggie - local animated shorts series aired in November 2013, also aired on TV3 at the same time
 Mirmo Zibang - first aired using Filem Karya Nusa dubbing, also aired its later series using other dubbing; first aired on TV3 between 2005 and 2006
 Misi Adruce (lit: Adruce's Mission) - community caring programme aired in 2007; also aired an Aidilfitri edition in 2007
 Misi Betty - local drama series
 Misteri Malam - local programme concentrating on local celebrities' paranormal experiences; aired in early 2013
 Mix Tape - local indie music performances programme under the 9X programme block
 Mobile Suit Gundam 00 - also aired on NTV7 in 2011
 Moby Dick -  children's animated series
 Moments of Impact Monster Kids - on hiatus, aired between 2009 and 2010, later re-run until December 2011, had some interruptions for other programmes for a certain period of time; also airs on Astro Ceria since December 2010
 Moonlight Muqaddimah - returning in 2012, motivational programme, the first programme of the day, the 2009 broadcast re-ran in December 2010
 Mutant X Mutiara Hati - Islamic themed Indonesian sinetron; the first season also re-ran from 29 November 2007 to early 2008 due to viewers response; also a block for Indonesian dramas airing weekdays at 5:40 pm
 My Friend Marsupilami - aired without Malay dubbing, first aired on TV3 in 2006; another later series aired on TV1 as of April 2011
 My Giant Friend - French animation series
 My Gym Partner's A Monkey - aired in January 2012 without Malay dubbing or subtitling; formerly aired on TV3 in late 2000s with Malay subtitles
 My Life as a Teenage Robot - also formerly aired on TV3 in original version with Malay subtitles
 Nabil & Co. Nana Narita Nasi Lemak Kopi O – TV9's own breakfast show airing only during the Friday to Sunday weekend; airing from 2008 to 2018; the programme's name changes during the Hari Raya Aidilfitri occasion which is Ketupat Rendang Kopi O. TV3's Borak Kopitiam picked up the show's concept upon its launch in 2018.
 National Geographic specials - a series of documentaries produced by National Geographic; formerly aired on TV3 in early 2000s and now airs on TV1 every evening in the 7:00 pm hour since late 2009
 The Nine Lives of Chloe King - drama under the 9X programme block
 Ninja Cat Ichi Ni San - local English-language animated series, aired between October 2013 and early January 2014; airing on TV3 since March 2014
 Ninja Warrior - aired in 2009, returned briefly in November 2013 with season 3
 Niquitin Quit Master Challenge Nur Kasih - aired as a re-run in 2010, originally aired on TV3 in 2009
 Ole-Ole Chef Wan - cooking show originally presented by Chef Wan in 2007 and 2008, later presented by other chefs
 Oo La La -  reality music competition aired in mid-2009
 Oshin - Japanese drama dubbed in Malay by Filem Karya Nusa, first aired on TV1 in 1986
 Otai Pak Pandir Moden (lit: Modern Pak Pandir) - Malay drama series aired in 2007
 Perman - uses different dubbing; formerly aired on TV2 in the early 2000s using Malay dubbing from Filem Karya Nusa
 Permata Hati Pesan Atok Pi Mai Pi Mai Tang Tu - sitcom show, first aired on TV3 in the 1990s and re-ran in 2000, now re-runs on Astro Warna as of 2010 and on Emas channel on Hypp TV in 2011
 Pichi Pichi Pitch - first aired on TV3 in 2006
 Planet Kiara - drama series; firstly aired on TV3 in 2012 and 2013
 Planet of the Reban - local animated series
 PJ Masks - started airing in 2018 
 Pokémon Diamond and Pearl - airs using the Japanese version and dubbed by Filem Karya Nusa
 Pokémon Master Quest - Malay dubbed by Filem Karya Nusa from the American version which was aired in early 2009; the earlier Pokémon series were aired on NTV7 with Malay subtitles in the early 2000s and aired at 8:30 pm, later with Malay dubbing in 2005; also aired on Astro Ceria in mid-2010
 Polis Gerakan Marin Pondok Pondok - children's variety show similar to Tom Tom Bak on Astro Ceria
 Popeye - classic shorts only; formerly aired on TV3
 Projek Gila - programme under the 9X programme block
 Projek Nadia - live action series; aired between August and December 2014
 Pukul Tiga Pagi (lit: Three O'clock in the Morning)
 Pulau - local drama series under the 9X programme block
 Puteri Malam - local drama under the 9X programme block
 Rasa-Rasa - cooking show airing in late 2010
 Rasa-Rasa Ikan - fish cooking show presented by Imuda; First aired on TV3 in 1999; also aired on Emas channel on UniFi as of July 2011
 Rasul Yang Kata - Islamic children's programme on applying the sunnah of Muhammad in daily life; aired in late 2012; segment excerpts taken from the programme are used as fillers after ends of programmes
 Rawan - drama series airing under the 9X programme block
 Realiti OKU (lit: OKU's Reality)
 Remaja - teenagers' magazine programme; formerly aired on TV3 between 1993 and 2010 (initial name as Remaja Sendirian Berhad or RSB in the 1990s, later changed to current name in early 2000s); later moved to this channel in 2011
 Remaja Ekstrem - re-run as of April 2012, youth magazine programme focusing on extreme sports, came out before Remaja aired on this channel in 2011
 Remedi - documentary series focusing on traditional medicine
 Resipi Istana The Road Runner Show Robot Arpo - South Korean animated series, airing on this channel since July 2013; also firstly airs on TV3
 Rocko's Modern Life - aired briefly in late 2010 and in 2013
 Rockumentary - programme under the 9X programme block
 Rona - real-life documentary series
 Rosalinda - airing on this channel between September and December 2013, later began re-run afterwards until February 2014; formerly aired on TV3 in early 2000s
 S.O.S. - emergency procedure learning documentary series
 Saksi Maut - documentary series
 Saladin: The Animated Series - airing on this channel between February and May 2014; has been aired and also air on TV3 in Malay, firstly on TV1 in English with Malay subtitles
 Sandra the Fairytale Detective Sarjana Muslim - local 2-dimensional animated programme telling about the famous Islamic scholars; duration is about 10 minutes; narrated by radio personality Faizal Ismail; was aired during the Ramadan month of the year 1428AH/2007; aired on TV Alhijrah in July 2011
 Satu Jam Bersama Ustaz Don - airing during Ramadan 1435H/2014M
 Scan2Go Scooby-Doo! Mystery Incorporated - airing on TV2 with Malay subtitles as of January 2014
 Sebenarnya Saya Isteri Dia - airing on this channel as a rerun in mid-2014; first aired on TV3
 Sembilu Kasih - drama series, formerly aired on TV3
 Separuh Jiwaku - drama series; rerun on TV3 as of October 2014
 Serikan Impian Anda Bersama Fair & Lovely - aired in mid-2013
 Shoutul Quran - Al-Quran learning programme for women hosted by Sharifah Khasif aired between January and December 2014; Season 1 was filmed from a studio; Season 2 was filmed at a coffee shop
 Siapa Pintar (lit: Who is Smart) - live interactive game show produced in 2007; also aired on TV3; it is also the name of an unrelated children's game show formerly aired in early 2009, also airing on Emas since August 2013
 Signs of the Hereafter - aired in mid-2013, reran in January 2015
 Sirrun - local drama series
 Skuad Pasar Malam - travelogue programme on food sold at various night markets across Malaysia; aired in early 2013
 Smallville - airs Season 9 as of October 2013, previously aired Season 8; previous seasons have been aired on TV3 until 2010
 Soundcheck - indie music programme under the 9X programme blockSoutheast Asian Games (until 2017) - (simulcast coverage and shared with TV1 (exclude 2015), TV2 (exclude 2015), TV3, and Astro)
 Spanar Jaya - airs as a re-run and also airs on Astro Warna; formerly aired on NTV7 in 1998 and also re-ran in mid-2012
 Sports Gone Wild Stanza - real-life people documentary series
 Star Ocean EX - first aired on Astro Ria in 2003, airing on TV2 as of March 2013 using English version with Malay subtitles
 Static Shock - Malay dubbed; formerly aired on TV3 in 2000s with Malay subtitles
 Strawberry Shortcake - without Malay dubbing, formerly aired on NTV7
 Studio Bintang Kecil (lit: Small Stars' Studio) - aired in 2008, produced by Double Vision
 Studio Nabil Suatu Hari Nanti - aired in mid-2008
 Suku - documentary series on Malaysian indigenous people
 Sunsilk Hijabku Gayaku - aired in late 2013, also aired as a sponsored segment of Hip TV
 Supa Strikas - aired in 2011 and 2012; airs using the Malay dub with casts from the voice talents who have done commercials on radio and television; also airing on TV3 as of late June 2014
 Super Inggo - dubbed by Filem Karya Nusa, aired in 2008
 Superderr Superman: The Animated Series - aired in Malay dubbing; also aired on NTV7 in late 2012 with Malay subtitles; first aired on TV3 in the early 2000s
 Supertots - local children's animated series; airing on this channel since April 2014, formerly aired on TV3 in 2012
 Surahs We Read Most - presented by Sheikh Yahya Ibrahim and produced by Mercy Mission Media UK, airing in July 2013
 Switch Off - programme concentrating on ghost pranks by local indie artists, part of 9X programme block; airing on TV3 as of April 2015
 Syifa' Wanita - aired between January and March 2015
 Soy Luna  - started airing on this channel on late August 2016 to September 2018 and also airs on TV3, in which both were dubbed in English with Malay Subtitles
 Tico and Friends Sylvester and Tweety Mysteries - aired in late 2010, formerly aired on TV3
 Takeshi's Castle - broadcasts the American version, formerly aired on NTV7 using original version with Malay dubbing and subtitles in the early 2000s
 Talian Hayat (lit: Life Line) - investigation show, formerly aired on NTV7 in 2009
 Tanah Merah - local horror drama series aired in 2013; first aired on Tonton and NTV7, then on TV9 in the 9X programme block after original run ended
 Taqwa – Islamic themed Indonesian sinetron, aired in 2008
 Taz-Mania Team Umizoomi - no longer airing as of late February 2014; was also aired on TV2 and NTV7, both aired with Malay subtitles
 Teen Wolf - drama series airing under the 9X programme block
 Theodore Tugboat - aired in 2009, very briefly aired in March 2012
 Tiada Sempadan (lit: No Borders) - real life documentary programme
 Ting Tong - also known as Ting Tong Kami Dah Sampai; cooking competition show hosted by Bell Ngasri impersonating a Chinese person, airing from August to December 2013
 Tom & Jerry Kids - formerly aired in Chicky Hour on TV3 in the 2000s, was also aired on TV2 as of September 2014
 The Triplets – formerly aired on TV2 in the late 2000s, also aired on TV3 in 2009 
 A Touch of Faith - presented by Sheikh Yahya Ibrahim and produced by Mercy Mission Media UK, airing in July 2013, rerun in March 2014
 TV Champion - aired in 2011
 Twins of Faith Special Series Ummi... Ceritalah Pada Kami - formerly aired on TV3 in mid-2012
 The Unit Untamed & Uncut Usik-usik Salih Yacob - talk show
 Usop Sontarian – formerly aired on TV1 in the late 1990s
 Usrah - on hiatus starting January 2014
 Ustaz Zamri Bercerita - also formerly aired on TV3 with English subtitles
 Vektor 58 - local science fiction action series; airing since 14 December 2013
 Versus - indie band music competition programme aired in 2012 and 2013 in the months between April and June, also aired on TV3 as a repeat telecast
 Video Zonkers Warna-Warna Malaysia (lit: Colours of Malaysia) - tourism programme formerly aired on TV3 in 1995; also aired on Emas channel on Hypp TV as of July 2011
 What's New, Scooby-Doo? World's Whackiest Sports Wow Wow Wubbzy - also aired on TV2 with Malay captions 
 Xiaolin Showdown - airs using Malay dubbing, also airs on NTV7, formerly aired on TV3 in the 2000s; has Malay subtitles when aired on TV3 and NTV7
 The X's - also aired on TV3 in original version
 Ya Beda Bedu''

References

TV9
TV9 Programmes